The 2013–14 Stephen F. Austin Ladyjacks basketball team represented Stephen F. Austin University during the 2013–14 NCAA Division I women's basketball season. The Ladyjacks were led by fourth year head coach Brandon Schneider and played their home games at the William R. Johnson Coliseum. They are members of the Southland Conference.  The Ladyjacks were Southland Conference regular season co-champions with Lamar and were runner-up in the 2014 Southland Conference women's basketball tournament.  They closed out post-season play as Runner-up in the 2014 Women's Basketball Invitational.

Roster

Schedule

|-
!colspan=9| Regular Season

|-
!colspan=9| 2014 Southland Conference women's basketball tournament

|-
!colspan=9| 2014 Women's Basketball Invitational

Source:

See also
2013–14 Stephen F. Austin Lumberjacks basketball team

References

Stephen F. Austin Ladyjacks basketball seasons
Stephen F. Austin
Stephen F. Austin Ladyjacks basketball
Stephen F. Austin Ladyjacks basketball